William Tinsley may refer to:

 William Tinsley (publisher) (1831–1902), British publisher
 William Tinsley (architect) (1804–1885), Irish-born architect in the United States